The year 1950 saw a number of significant happenings in radio broadcasting history.

Events
 15 March – The Copenhagen Frequency Plan is implemented by broadcasters throughout Europe.
 1 May – Springbok Radio, South Africa's first commercial radio station, takes to the airwaves. It will broadcast for 35 years, until 31 December 1985.
 5 June – In the Federal Republic of Germany, Bayerischer Rundfunk, Hessischer Rundfunk, Nordwestdeutscher Rundfunk, Radio Bremen, Süddeutscher Rundfunk, and Südwestfunk jointly establish the ARD consortium of public broadcasting authorities.

Debuts

Programs
 1 January – Hopalong Cassidy debuts on Mutual.
 6 January – The Halls of Ivy debuts on NBC.
 9 January – Hannibal Cobb debuts on ABC.
 16 January – Listen with Mother debuts on the BBC Light Programme.
 22 January – The Adventures of Christopher London debuts on NBC.
 30 January – Mark Trail debuts on Mutual.
 1 February – Big Jon and Sparkie debuts on ABC.
 6 February – Dangerous Assignment debuts on NBC.
 7 May
 The Big Guy debuts on NBC.
 Cloak and Dagger debuts on NBC.
 6 June – Educating Archie debuts on the BBC Light Programme.
 7 June – The Archers pilot episodes debut on BBC radio; it will still be running 65 years later.
 2 July – Hashknife Hartley debuts on Mutual.
 3 July – Granby's Green Acres debuts on CBS.
 24 September – Charlie Wild, Private Detective debuts on NBC.
 29 October – Meet Frank Sinatra debuts on CBS.
 5 November
 The Big Show introduced by Tallulah Bankhead debuts on NBC.
 Life with the Lyons starring Ben Lyon and Bebe Daniels debuts on the BBC Light Programme.
 29 November – I Fly Anything debuts on ABC.
 6 December – American Agent debuts on ABC.

Stations
 12 February – WPAW Pawtucket, Rhode Island signs on for the first time.
 1 March –WBUR-FM on the air with studios and a 400 watt transmitter located at 84 Exeter Street in Boston.
 1 March – DZBB, a radio station owned by Republic Broadcasting Systems (later GMA Network) in the Philippines begins broadcasting from its first studios in Calvo Bldg, Bindondo, Manila.
 19 April – WTSA Brattleboro, Vermont signs on for the first time.
 8 October – WARA Attleboro, Massachusetts signs on for the first time.

Closings
 6 January – Lora Lawson ends its run on network radio (NBC).
 19 January – The Better Half ends its run on network radio (Mutual).
 29 March – Curtain Time ends its run on network radio (NBC).
 30 April – The Adventures of Christopher London ends its run on network radio (NBC).
 1 June – The Chesterfield Supper Club ends its run on network radio (NBC).
 6 July – Blondie ends its run on network radio (ABC).
 21 July – Ladies Be Seated ends its run on network radio (ABC).
 15 August – Destination Freedom – episodes written by Richard Durham ended  – episodes under the same series name continued in 1950
 21 August – Granby's Green Acres ends its run on network radio (CBS).
 29 August – The Candid Microphone ends its run on network radio (CBS).
 1 September – The Adventures of the Thin Man ends its run on network radio (ABC).
 6 September – Chandu the Magician ends its run on network radio (ABC).
 15 September – Bride and Groom (radio program) ends its run on network radio (ABC).
 22 October – Cloak and Dagger ends its run on network radio (NBC).
 29 October – The Big Guy ends its run on network radio (NBC).

Births
 2 February – Libby Purves, English radio presenter.
 14 March – Rick Dees, American radio and television personality.
 12 May – Jenni Murray, English journalist, presenter of Woman's Hour.
 21 May – Marian Finucane, Irish radio presenter (died 2020).
 24 September – Alan Colmes, American radio and television talk show host.

Deaths
 13 January – Thomas S. "Tommy" Lee, son of pioneering broadcaster Don Lee, of a suicide. His death triggers the sale of the Don Lee Network (a station group including KFRC AM/FM in San Francisco and KHJ AM/FM in Los Angeles) to General Tire, forerunner of RKO General.
 26 July – Austin E. Lathrop, owner of Midnight Sun Broadcasting (KFAR, KENI), rail car collision.
 2 September – Frank Graham, American announcer for many programs and the star (following Jack Webb) of Jeff Regan, Investigator.

References

 
Radio by year